Dry fly fishing is an angling technique in which the lure is an artificial fly which floats on the surface of the water and does not sink below it. Developed originally for trout fly fishing.

The fish and the dry fly

Fly fishing for trout can be done using various methods and types of flies. Trout mostly feed near the bed of the stream, where wet flies and especially nymphs are used. They typically only come to the surface to feed when there is a large bug hatch during which thousands of aquatic insects grow wings and leave the water to mate and lay eggs. Particularly during the summer months and on smaller mountain streams, trout also often feed on terrestrial insects such as ants, beetles and grasshoppers when they fall onto the water surface. It is on these surface-feeding occasions that the dry fly can be an effective lure.

At certain times, salmon will also rise to a fly on the surface and dry flies may also be used to fish for them.

The aim of dry-fly fishing is to mimic the downstream drifting of a real fly on the surface of the water. To be successful it requires both manual skill and a good knowledge of the fish and its surroundings. It is also a pleasurable occupation on a slow, dreamy Summer's day. Because of this it gained a reputation as the aristocrat of angling sports, superior to all other kinds of angling.

Angling technique

Dry-fly fishing uses a line and flies that float. They are joined by a fine 3 to 5 meters long leader, typically of  nylon monofilament line, which is tapered so that it is nearly invisible where the fly is knotted, and the angler can replace the last meter or so of nylon as required.

Most of a trout's food is carried to it on the current, so they tend to face upstream with their attention focused into the current. Trout fishermen therefore prefer to begin downstream of the fish's suspected lie and work upstream into the current. Trout can see a wide area around them, so the angler must stay not only downstream of the fish, but also as low to the ground and as far from the bank as possible, moving upstream with stealth.

Trout tend to strike their food at current "edges", where faster- and slower-moving waters mix. Obstructions to the stream flow, such as large rocks or nearby pools, provide a "low energy" environment where fish sit and wait for food without expending much energy. Casting upstream to the edge of the slower water, the angler can see the fly land and drift slowly back downstream. 
The fly should land softly, as if dropped onto the water, with the leader carefully positioned(mended) as to control the drift thru the strike zone and present the fly to intended target first without making fish previously aware of the anglers presence.

The challenge in stream fishing is to place the fly with deadly accuracy, within inches of a protective rock for instance, to mimic the behaviour of a real fly. When done properly, the fly appears to be just floating along in the current with a "perfect drift" as if not connected to the fly line. The angler must remain vigilant for the "take" in order to be ready to raise the rod tip and set the hook.

Due to rivers having faster and slower currents often running side by side, the fly can overtake or be overtaken by the line, thus disturbing the fly's drift. Mending is a technique whereby one lifts and moves the part of the line that requires re-aligning with the fly's drift, thus extending the drag free drift. The mend can be upstream or downstream depending on the currents carrying the line or fly. To be effective, any mending of the fly line should not disturb the natural drift of the fly. Learning to mend is often much easier if the angler can see the fly.

Unlike wet fly fishing, the "take" on a dry fly is visible, explosive and exciting. Right from the beginning, anglers often prefer dry fly fishing because of the relative ease of detecting a strike and the instant gratification of seeing a trout strike their fly. Nymph fishing is easier it doesn't require " angling" skills associated with learning various casting techniques, but dry fly anglers can become addicted to the surface strike.

Once a fish has been caught and landed, the fly may be wet and no longer float well. Flies can sometimes be dried by "false" casting back and forth in the air. With care, a small piece of reusable absorbent towel, an amadou patch or a Chamois leather may be used. A used dry fly which refuses to float may be replaced with another similar or identical fly while the original dries out more thoroughly, rotating through a set of flies. After drying a fly may need a fresh application of water-repellent fly "dressing" liquid.

Dry flies

A dry fly is designed to land softly on the surface of the water without breaking it and becoming wetted. It need not be inherently buoyant. They are often oiled or treated with another water repellent. Dry flies are generally considered to be freshwater flies.

A dry fly may be of the imitation or attractor type. Imitations typically represent the adult form of an aquatic or terrestrial insect, such as the elk hair caddis, a caddisfly imitation. The small Baetis (blue-winged olive, BWO) is another common fly, for which several imitators have been designed. A beginner may wish to start with a fly that is easily seen, such as the Royal Wulff attractor or a mayfly imitation such as a parachute Adams or Trico. The "parachute" on the parachute adams helps the fly to land as softly as a natural on the water and has the added benefit of making the fly very visible from the surface. Being able to see the fly easily is helpful to the beginner.

A translucent fly seen from underneath with sunlight shining through it looks very different to a fly when out of the sun. Some dry flies, especially imitators, are especially designed to mimic this effect. J. W. Dunne developed a technique of painting the shaft of the hook white and wrapping it in translucent artificial silk, which he then oiled.

Salmon flies, such as the Parks' Salmonfly, are usually larger than trout flies.

The following is a list of the more popular dry flies for trout:

 Adams, including Parachute Adams, Spent or Cripple Adams, Klinkhammer Adams, Purple Haze
 Ant
 Asher (similar to the Griffith Gnat, imitates midge clusters)
 Blue Dun
 Blue-winged Olive, Parachute BWO, Klinkhammer BWO
 Callibaetis, including Cripple Callibaetis, Comparadun (Callibaetis imitation)
 Caddis, Elk Hair Caddis, CDC Caddis, X-Caddis (Caddisfly imitation, aka Sedge)
 Cahill, Light Cahill, Dark Cahill, Parachute Cahill (Stenonema imitation)
 Crane fly (Crane fly imitation), Daddy Long Legs
 Damselfly (Damselfly imitation)
 Drake, Brown, Yellow, Green
 Grasshopper, including foam, Chernobyl, and bullet head hoppers 
 Griffith's Gnat (imitates Gnat, named after George Griffith one of the founders of Trout Unlimited)
 Hendrickson, Light and Dark Henrickson, Parachute Henrickson (Ephemerella subvaria Mayfly imitation)
 Humpy (resembles a host of Mayflies, none in particular)
 Isonychia, Isonychia Spinner (Isonychia imitation)
 March Brown (Rhithrogena germanica imitation)
 Minny Popper
 Mosquito
 Pale Morning Dun (Ephemerella excrucians imitation), Pale Evening Dun, Sparkle Dun, Sulphur Dun
 Quill, Gray Quill, Ginger Quill, Quill Gordon
 Spinner, Rusty Spinner, Trico, Hex Spinner
 Stimulator, Sedge
 Wolffs, Royal Wulff, attractor fly

History
Dry fly fishing first became a serious sport in the 19th century, with the publication by Frederic M. Halford of two books: Floating Flies and How to Dress Them and Dry-Fly Fishing in Theory and Practice. His artificials were designed to imitate real flies but they only did so under limited conditions. This led J. W. Dunne to develop a theory of trout vision, and from it a series of imitators intended for use in sunny weather, which he published in 1924 as Sunshine and the Dry Fly.

Meanwhile G. E. M. Skues had begun promoting wet nymph fishing. He went on to popularise the use of attractors, designed to goad the fish rather than to fool it. Skues' approach outraged the traditionalists who favoured the dry fly and in 1938 the Flyfishers' Club staged what amounted to an inquisition hearing against him. However Skues' approach proved more effective in the majority of situations.

Dry fly fishing has remained a popular sport.

References

Bibliography

Recreational fishing
Fly fishing
Insects in culture